Israel Elías Poblete Zúñiga (born June 22, 1995) is a Chilean footballer who plays as a midfielder for Chilean Primera División club Universidad de Chile.

Career
Poblete was born in Santiago, but began his football career as a youngster with Cobresal, based in the mining town of El Salvador. He made his first-team debut on October 25, 2014, as a second-half substitute in a 3–2 defeat away to Universidad de Concepción in the Primera División, and made four substitute appearances in the 2015 Clausura, including the penultimate fixture of the season in which Cobreloa came back from 2–1 down to beat Barnechea 3–2 and clinch their first Primera title. He played increasingly regularly over the next two seasons, but when Cobresal were relegated in the 2016–17 season, Poblete remained in the top flight, joining Unión Española on an 18-month loan. He appeared in all but one of the 2017 Torneo de Transición matcheshalf as starter, half as substituteand contributed to the team's runners-up placing.

Honours
Cobresal
 Chilean Primera División: 2015 Clausura

Unión Española
 Chilean Primera División runner-up: 2017 Torneo de Transición

External links

References

1995 births
Living people
People from Santiago
Chilean footballers
Association football midfielders
Cobresal footballers
Unión Española footballers
C.D. Huachipato footballers
Chilean Primera División players